Andrei Agius (born 12 August 1986) is a Maltese footballer who plays as a central defender for Hibernians.

Club career

Early career
Agius began his career with Santa Lucija, his hometown club, before joining the youth nursery of Sliema Wanderers, the most decorated club in Maltese football.

In July 2003, Agius was part of the Sliema Wanderers under-16 squad that participated in the Nikola Kotkov Tournament, organised by the Academy Lokomotiv 101.

On 19 December 2003, aged only 17, Agius, who started out as a midfielder, made his senior debut for Sliema Wanderers in a Premier League match against Floriana but his determination to pursue a professional career meant that, just weeks after his first senior appearance, the then teenage defender left for his first overseas challenge.

Serbia and Montenegro 
Agius headed to Serbia and Montenegro to join first-division club Zemun on an initial six-month contract but played mostly for Zemun's youth team, scoring two goals in the process.

Italy 
In the summer of 2004, Agius moved to Italy after catching the eye of Sicilian club Sporting Mascalucia who offered him a contract. In his first season with Sport Club Mascalucia, Agius scored three goals and was voted as the most promising midfielder in the Italy's regional championship.

Following another positive season with Mascalucia, Agius secured a contract with then Serie A club Messina, where he became a regular in the reserve squad. In his first season with Messina, Agius switched from midfield to defence.

In February 2006, Agius featured in the Torneo Mondiale di Calcio Coppa Carnevale and scored two goals, one against Pistoiese and the other against Torino. In May 2006, Agius was among the Messina substitutes for the Serie A match against Empoli.

After his initial one-year spell with Messina, Agius was loaned to Serie C side Martina during the August transfer window in 2006. In season 2006–07, Agius faced intense competition for first-team places from experienced and seasoned players but still managed to make some appearances for Martina in the Coppa Italia.

In season 2007–08, Agius moved to Igea Virtus, regarded as the second team of Messina Calcio. In his first season with Igea Virtus, Agius played 34 league matches and one in the Coppa Italia. His performances with Virtus earned him a four-year contract with Messina in March 2008 but the following summer, financial difficulties forced the Serie B club to file for bankruptcy. Agius was freed from his contractual obligations with the club and rejoined Igea Virtus where he was an automatic choice in their first team.

Later on in the 2009–10 season, Agius signed for Serie C team Cassino in a co-ownership deal with Salernitana. In January 2010, Agius was loaned to Melfi, and eventually signed a two-year contract with the club. A year later, it looked as though Agius was going to sign for Serie B side Triestina, and also played for the team in a triangular tournament, but nothing came of it.

In January 2011, Agius joined Maltese Premier League club Birkirkara on a short-term loan deal. On 31 August 2011, Agius signed for Italian side Latina, and was part of the squad that won promotion to Serie B as well as winning the 2012–13 Coppa Italia Lega Pro. US Latina's promotion to the second division of Italian football led to a squad overhaul in the summer of 2013 and Agius opted to join Sardinian club Torres.

Return to Malta 
In the summer of 2014, Agius returned to Malta to join Hibernians, his hometown club. With his current club he won two Maltese Premier League titles (in 2014–15 and 2016–17).

Agius was also in the Hibs team that caused a shock by beating Israel's Maccabi Tel Aviv 2–1 in the first leg of their 2015–16 UEFA Champions League second qualifying round tie at the Hibernians Stadium on 14 July 2015. In 2019, he won the award as Maltese Player of the Year.

International career 
Agius earned his first call-up to Malta's under-21 squad, then coached by Mark Miller, in August 2003 for a friendly match against Italy under-21. Agius has represented Malta 37 times at under-21 level. In 2005, he formed part of the Malta under-21 team that participated in the Mediterranean Games, held in Almería, Spain.

In February 2006, Agius, then aged 19, was named in Malta's senior squad for the biennial Malta International football tournament. The other participating nations were Georgia and Moldova.

On 4 June 2021, he played his 100th match for Malta in a 2–1 loss in a friendly match against Kosovo.

Career statistics

International goals
Scores and results list Malta's goal tally first.

Honours
US Calcio Latina
Coppa Italia Lega Pro: 2012–13

Hibernians
Maltese Premier League: 2014–15, 2016–17 2021-22
Maltese Super Cup: 2015

Individual
Malta Football Players Association Team of the Year: 2014–15
Maltese Player of the Year: 2019

See also
 List of men's footballers with 100 or more international caps

References

External links

1986 births
Living people
People from Pietà, Malta
Maltese footballers
Association football defenders
A.S.D. Cassino Calcio 1924 players
FK Zemun players
A.C.R. Messina players
A.S.D. Martina Calcio 1947 players
A.S.D. Igea Virtus Barcellona players
A.S. Melfi players
Birkirkara F.C. players
Maltese Premier League players
Maltese expatriate footballers
Expatriate footballers in Serbia and Montenegro
Expatriate footballers in Italy
Maltese expatriate sportspeople in Italy
Maltese expatriate sportspeople in Serbia and Montenegro
Malta under-21 international footballers
Malta international footballers
Competitors at the 2005 Mediterranean Games
S.E.F. Torres 1903 players
F.C. Aprilia Racing Club players
Mediterranean Games competitors for Malta
FIFA Century Club